Tekokota is one of the Central Tuamotu atolls, located close to the geographic center of the archipelago.

Tekokota Atoll is one of the smallest atolls of the Tuamotus. Its islands have a total land mass of only .

The western side of Tekokota Atoll is submerged.

Tekokota Atoll is uninhabited. The closest land to Tekokota is Hikueru Atoll, located 22 km to the south.

History
Tekokota was first sighted by James Cook in 1773. He named Tekokota Atoll "Doubtful".

Months later Spanish explorer José de Andía called this atoll, "La del Peligro" (The Dangerous One).
A few days later, another Spanish navigator Domingo de Boenechea sighted Tekokota on ship Aguila. He named this atoll "Los Mártires".

Administration
Tekokota Atoll belongs to the commune of Hikueru, which consists of the atolls of Hikueru, Marokau, Ravahere, Reitoru and Tekokota.

See also

 Desert island
 List of islands

References

External links
NZTEC - Spanish voyages of the 18th century
Atoll list (in French)

Atolls of the Tuamotus
Uninhabited islands of French Polynesia